Llywarch ap Hyfaidd (died ) was a king of Dyfed from  until its conquest around 904 by King Cadell of Ceredigion / Seisyllwg and his son Hywel.

Upon Llywarch's death, the kingdom passed briefly to his brother Rhodri, but Hywel soon consolidated his rule, eventually merging Dyfed with his paternal inheritance as the new kingdom of Deheubarth. Later Welsh tradition held that Hywel inherited Dyfed peacefully through his supposed marriage to Llywarch's daughter Elen in a manner similar to the stories told about his great-grandfather Merfyn's acquisition of Gwynedd, his grandfather Rhodri's acquisition of Powys, and his father's acquisition of Ceredigion, all of this despite female inheritance of land having no place in the Welsh law of the period. However, the repeated attacks of Cadell and Hywel were recorded in Asser's Life of King Alfred, where it states Hyfaidd was replaced by his brother Rhodri, although the cause of his death is unknown.

See also
Kings of Wales family trees

References

10th-century Welsh monarchs
9th-century Welsh monarchs
Monarchs of Dyfed
9th-century births
900s deaths
Year of birth unknown